A dawn song is a song about lovers separating at dawn. The same genre is found under different names in several medieval languages:

Alba (Occitan)
Aubade (French)
Tagelied (German)

See also
Dawn Song, a professor at the University of California, Berkeley
Dawnsong, a public artwork in Indianapolis
Song of the Dawn, a 1930 song